Bussa was a Barbadian rebel slave

Bussa may also refer to:
 Bussa Emancipation Statue, a monument to slave Bussa in Barbados
 Bussa (butterfly), a genus of butterfly
 Bussa, Nigeria, a former town in Nigeria
 New Bussa, the Nigerian town that replaced Bussa after its destruction
 Bussa language, a language spoken in Ethiopia
 Bussa (surname), a surname (including a list of people with the name)

See also
 Busa (disambiguation)